La Fauxmagerie (from French  "false" or "imitation" and  "cheese shop") is the UK's first vegan cheese shop. It sells plant-based substitutes for dairy cheese, operating a retail store in London's Shoreditch area as well as selling online and wholesale. Founded in 2019, the shop's range includes vegan versions of Camembert, Cheddar, goat cheese, blue cheese, and feta. It is operated by the Welsh siblings Rachel and Charlotte Stevens. La Fauxmagerie received press attention in 2019 after Dairy UK, a lobby group, threatened to sue them over the use of the phrase "plant-based cheese".

History 
Founders Rachel and Charlotte Stevens met some of their future suppliers at Vegfest UK in 2017 while searching for better quality plant-based products. They  opened La Fauxmagerie in London's Brixton district in 2019 and quickly gained a loyal customer following while outgrowing their first store within 6 months. They moved to a much larger store in the Brick Lane area in Shoreditch, London, in June 2019 and launched their e-commerce offering in the same month.

La Fauxmagerie has grown significantly in its first 3 years, expanding their retail and online offering, while launching their own brand of aged plant-based cheeses, and opening London's first dedicated vegan wine and cheese bar - The Cheese Cellar, which is situated beneath their Shoreditch store. In May 2022, the company started supplying Waitrose supermarkets.

Both founders follow a vegan diet and play an active role in the day to day running of their Shoreditch store and product developmemt.

References 

Vegan brands
Veganism in the United Kingdom
Cheese analogues
Cheese retailers